Shinga is a town in Gombe State of Nigeria.   It lies at an elevation of 425 meters between the Bima Hills and the left (east) bank of the Gongola River.

Notes

Populated places in Gombe State